Minimal algebra is an important concept in tame congruence theory, a theory that has been developed by Ralph McKenzie and David Hobby.

Definition
A minimal algebra is a finite algebra with more than one element, in which every non-constant unary polynomial is a permutation on its domain.

Classification
A polynomial of an algebra is a composition of its basic operations, -ary operations and the projections. Two algebras are called polynomially equivalent if they have the same universe and precisely the same polynomial operations. A minimal algebra  falls into one of the following types (P. P. Pálfy)  

  is of type , or affine type, iff  is polynomially equivalent to a vector space.

  is of type , or Boolean type, iff  is polynomially equivalent to a two-element Boolean algebra.

  is of type , or lattice type, iff  is polynomially equivalent to a two-element lattice.

  is of type , or semilattice type, iff  is polynomially equivalent to a two-element semilattice.

References

Algebra